In combinatorial mathematics, a large set of positive integers

is one such that the infinite sum of the reciprocals

diverges.  A small set is any subset of the positive integers that is not large; that is, one whose sum of reciprocals converges.

Large sets appear in the Müntz–Szász theorem and in the Erdős conjecture on arithmetic progressions.

Examples
 Every finite subset of the positive integers is small.
 The set  of all positive integers is known to be a large set; this statement is equivalent to the divergence of the harmonic series.  More generally, any arithmetic progression (i.e., a set of all integers of the form an + b with a ≥ 1, b ≥ 1 and n = 0, 1, 2, 3, ...) is a large set.
 The set of square numbers is small (see Basel problem). So is the set of cube numbers, the set of 4th powers, and so on. More generally, the set of positive integer values of any polynomial of degree 2 or larger forms a small set.
 The set {1, 2, 4, 8, ...} of powers of 2 is known to be a small set, and so is any geometric progression (i.e., a set of numbers of the form of the form abn with a ≥ 1, b ≥ 2 and n = 0, 1, 2, 3, ...).
 The set of prime numbers has been proven to be large. The set of twin primes has been proven to be small (see Brun's constant).
 The set of prime powers which are not prime (i.e., all numbers of the form pn with n ≥ 2 and p prime) is a small set although the primes are a large set. This property is frequently used in analytic number theory. More generally, the set of perfect powers is small, even the set of powerful numbers is small.
 The set of numbers whose expansions in a given base exclude a given digit is small.  For example, the set

of integers whose decimal expansion does not include the digit 7 is small.  Such series are called Kempner series.
 Any set whose upper asymptotic density is nonzero, is large.

Properties
 Every subset of a small set is small.
 The union of finitely many small sets is small, because the sum of two convergent series is a convergent series.  (In set theoretic terminology, the small sets form an ideal.)
 The complement of every small set is large.
This is a generalization of the Stone–Weierstrass theorem.

Open problems involving large sets
Paul Erdős famously asked the question of whether any set that does not contain arbitrarily long arithmetic progressions must necessarily be small.  He offered a prize of $3000 for the solution to this problem, more than for any of his other conjectures,  and joked that this prize offer violated the minimum wage law. This question is still open.

It is not known how to identify whether a given set is large or small in general. As a result, there are many sets which are not known to be either large or small.

See also
List of sums of reciprocals

Notes

References
 A. D. Wadhwa (1975). An interesting subseries of the harmonic series. American Mathematical Monthly 82 (9) 931–933. 

Combinatorics
Integer sequences
Mathematical series